The Chandler Reservation is a  protected area owned by the town of Warner, New Hampshire, United States. The  Harriman Chandler State Forest borders it to the southwest.

History
Additional property has been added over time. Since 1928 it has been managed by the Chandler Reservation Committee, an elected board. The area was logged at various times and in the 1930s the Civilian Conservation Corps was involved in creating pulpwood plantations and trails.

See also
List of New Hampshire state forests

References

Warner, New Hampshire
Protected areas of New Hampshire